Dota (Dorothea "Dota" Kehr , born 1979) is a singer-songwriter from Berlin and the leader of the musical group Dota und die Stadtpiraten ("Urban Pirates") who writes and performs music influenced by bossa nova and jazz. Her records have been self-published on her own Kleingeldprinzessin Records (Pocket-Change Princess Records) label and distributed by Broken Silence. Kehr declined to perform at party conventions during the 2005 Bundestag elections. In October 2006, she performed five concerts in Russia upon the invitation of the Goethe Institute and in the spring of 2009 she toured New Zealand.

Personal and professional life

Kehr grew up in the Berlin neighborhoods of Ruhleben, Zehlendorf und Schöneberg. As a child she played the saxophone and at 14 started performing in the public markets. Only at 21 did she begin to learn to play the guitar. She then went on to gain experience with street music, and because of this she was known by her artist name of Kleingeldprinzessin (Pocket-Change Princess). Her early work was influenced by Bossa Nova. Her love of South American music came from her childhood, especially a cassette left behind by a Brazilian babysitter: Elis & Tom (Elis Regina and Tom Jobim, 1974).

Kehr studied medicine in Berlin and graduated in 2010, but went on to live and record music in Brazil and Ecuador.

The 2010 album Bis auf den Grund (Down to the Bottom) starts to show strong influence from Folk Rock music and elements of jazz.

Kehr has two children, born in 2011 and 2013.

Discography
 Kleingeldprinzessin (2003)
 Mittelinselurlaub (2003)
 Taschentöne – live (2004)
 Blech + Plastik (2005)
 Immer nur Rosinen (2006)
 In anderen Räumen – live (2008)
 Schall und Schatten (2009)
 Bis auf den Grund (2010)
 Solo Live (2011)
 Das große Leuchten (2011)
 Wo soll ich suchen (2013)
 Keine Gefahr (2016)
 Überall Konfetti – live (2016)
 Die Freiheit (2018)
 Kaléko (2020)
 Wir Rufen Dich, Galaktika (2021)
 Einfach So Verloren (2021)

References

Sources
 taz, 2. April 2004 (Berlin lokal, S. 28)
 Berliner Zeitung, 28. September 2006 (Lokales, S. 28)
 Tagesspiegel Online, 26. September 2006
 Deutschlandradio Kultur, 20. December 2006

External links

 
 
 Dota und Die Stadtpiraten

1979 births
Living people
Singers from Berlin
German jazz singers
Bossa nova musicians
21st-century German women singers
German women singer-songwriters
Women jazz singers